Chankurbe (Dargwa: ЧӀянкӀурбе) is a rural locality (a selo) and the administrative centre of Chankubinsky Selsoviet, Buynaksky District, Republic of Dagestan, Russia. The population was 1,209 as of 2010. There are nine streets.

Geography 
Chankurbe is located 34 km southeast of Buynaksk (the district's administrative centre) by road. Kadar and Vanashimakhi are the nearest rural localities.

References 

Rural localities in Buynaksky District